Anopina undata is a moth of the family Tortricidae. It is found in Mexico.

References

Moths described in 1914
undata
Moths of Central America